Idaea costiguttata  is a moth of the family Geometridae. It is found in China and Taiwan.

Sterrhini
Moths described in 1896
Moths of Asia